Lahpai Seng Raw is the founder of Myanmar's largest civil society group, Metta Development Foundation. Founded in 1997, the group runs healthcare, agriculture and peace projects in Kachin State. In July 2013, she was awarded a Ramon Magsaysay Award.

Biography
A psychology major graduate in Rangoon University, Seng Raw started to work with the internally displaced people from Myanmar-China border from 1987 up to 1997. During that period, she became the development officer-in-charge in Kachin Independence Organization's humanitarian wing (ROKA). In 1997, she started the Metta Development Foundation, a non-government organization that helps displaced people of war afflicted zones in the country.

References

Living people
1949 births
Burmese people of Kachin descent
Ramon Magsaysay Award winners
Burmese activists
University of Yangon alumni
20th-century Burmese women
21st-century Burmese women